The 1913 Portland Beavers season was the 11th season in the history of the Portland Beavers baseball team. Under the leadership of manager Walt McCredie, the team compiled a 109–86 record and won the Pacific Coast League (PCL) pennant. The Beavers won five PCL pennants between 1906 and 1914. 

Second baseman Bill Rodgers was the team captain and led the PCL with 239 hits. Pitchers Hi West and Bill James ranked first and second in the league with earned run averages of 1.71 and 1.98.

1913 PCL standings

Statistics

Batting 
Note: Pos = Position; G = Games played; AB = At bats; H = Hits; Avg. = Batting average; HR = Home runs; SLG = Slugging percentage; SB = Stolen bases

Pitching 
Note: G = Games pitched; IP = Innings pitched; W = Wins; L = Losses; PCT = Win percentage; ERA = Earned run average; SO = Strikeouts

References

1913 in sports in Oregon
Pacific Coast League seasons
1913 in Portland, Oregon